The Pro-Composites Vision is an American amateur-built aircraft, designed by Steve Rahm and produced by Pro-Composites of Buffalo Grove, Illinois. The aircraft is supplied in the form of plans for amateur construction, with some pre-formed parts made available to speed construction.

The design was originally marketed by American Affordable Aircraft of Daytona Beach.

Design and development
The Vision features a cantilever low wing, a two-seats-in-side-by-side configuration cockpit under a bubble canopy, fixed conventional landing gear or optional tricycle gear with wheel pants and a single engine in tractor configuration.

The Vision SP model is made from pre-formed flat fiberglass and foam composite panels which are then radius bent to shape. Its  span wing employs a NACA 63A-415 airfoil at the wing root, transitioning to a NACA 63A-412 airfoil at the wing tip. The tricycle landing gear version features a fully castering nosewheel and differential braking for steering.

The manufacturer markets the design as "the only all composite, plans built, 2 seat sport aircraft that uses a conventional - non canard - platform."

Variants
Vision SP
Vision EX

Specifications (Vision SP)

References

External links

Homebuilt aircraft
Single-engined tractor aircraft
Low-wing aircraft
Vision
1990s United States sport aircraft